For people with the surname, see Garduño.

Garduño's is a Mexican and New Mexican cuisine restaurant chain from the city of Albuquerque, New Mexico. They have two locations in Albuquerque, and formerly had locations in Las Cruces, Santa Fe, Phoenix area and the Las Vegas Valley.

History
It was started as a small family-owned restaurant in 1969. Since then, they have expanded into a chain of restaurants. The chain ran into financial trouble in 2011, filing for Chapter 7 bankruptcy, they were purchased by Southwest Brands.

Afterward several of their locations closed, including their Las Vegas Valley  locations.

They have started to open new locations in the Albuquerque area, though there have not been any announcements for a return to Las Vegas, Nevada.

Specialties
Garduño's is known for their large plates of Mexican and New Mexican foods, as well their large margaritas and various alcohols.

Reception
They have received accolades in both their home state of New Mexico, and their Las Vegas Valley locations. For example, between their Palms Casino Resort and Fiesta Rancho locations, they were voted Las Vegas Review-Journal's "Best Mexican Restaurant" consecutively for nearly 20 years.

In popular culture
Their location at Winrock Shopping Center was featured in Breaking Bad.

References

External links
 

Mexican-American culture in Albuquerque, New Mexico
Restaurants established in 1969
Restaurant chains in the United States
Restaurants in Albuquerque, New Mexico
Restaurants in New Mexico
Restaurants in Nevada
1969 establishments in New Mexico